The Good Hope Centre in Cape Town, South Africa (1976) by Pier Luigi Nervi, is an exhibition hall and conference centre, with the exhibition hall comprising an arch with tie-beam on each of the four vertical facades and two diagonal arches supporting two intersecting barrel-like roofs which in turn were constructed from pre-cast concrete triangular coffers with in-situ concrete beams on the edges.

Construction
The main contractor was Murray and Stewart (Pty) Ltd. Consulting engineers KFD Wilkinson and Partners were local agents for Studio Nervi. Depropping of the entire structure was carried out during December 1976. Murray and Stewart published a postcard showing 18 tower cranes at their sites in Cape Town that year.

Maintenance and operation
The city of Cape Town has budgeted approximately R3.5 million for the general upgrade of the venue. The venue hosts numerous events throughout the year from expo's to cultural performances. 
The exhibition centre offers a wide range of spaces and a total of 4,500 square metres of space. As a sports arena the venue has a maximum capacity of 7,000 people.

Events

See also

 Cape Town International Convention Centre

References

External links

Buildings and structures in Cape Town
Tourist attractions in Cape Town
1976 establishments in South Africa
Sports venues in Cape Town
Music venues in South Africa
Netball venues in South Africa
Pier Luigi Nervi buildings
Modernist architecture